Cecidoses is a genus of moth in the family Cecidosidae.

Species
 Cecidoses argentinana
 Cecidoses eremita
 Cecidoses minutanus

References

Cecidosidae
Adeloidea genera